Aspergillus kanagawaensis is a species of fungus in the genus Aspergillus. It is from the Cervini section. The species was first described in 1951. It has been reported to a few extrolites, including two polar indol-alkaloids and one polar indol-alkaloid.

Growth and morphology

A. kanagawaensis has been cultivated on both Czapek yeast extract agar (CYA) plates and Malt Extract Agar Oxoid® (MEAOX) plates. The growth morphology of the colonies can be seen in the pictures below.

References 

kanagawaensis
Fungi described in 1951